The American team competed at the 2011 World Aquatics Championships in Shanghai, China from July 16 to July 31.  The United States topped the gold medal count in the competition with 17 golds and finished the competition with 32 total medals, behind China's 36.  16 of the 17 gold medals came from the swimming competition and one came from the open water swimming competition.  Individually, Michael Phelps won the most overall medals in the competition with seven (four golds, two silvers, one bronze).  Ryan Lochte won the most gold medals among the male competitors with five and finished the competition with six medals total.

Medalists

Key: (WR) = World record, (AM) = Americas record, (NR) = National record (If a swim is a world record, it is subsequently an area and national record).

Diving

There are two spots in each individual event (1 m, 3 m, and 10 m) and one team spot for each synchronized event (3 m and 10 m) that American divers are eligible for. The first selection for men's and women's 3 m and 10 m events was the 2011 USA Diving Winter National Championships, where the four divers with the top cumulative score moved onto the second selection event, the 2011 Fina USA Diving Grand Prix. At the 2011 Fina USA Diving Grand Prix, the top two divers with the highest cumulative score are selected to represent the United States.

The selection for synchronized events and the men's and women's 1 m springboard took place in May.

In all, there will be 14 divers (6 men & 8 females). The divers who are going to the 2011 Fina USA Diving Grand Prix, and are eligible to be selected to represent the United States is as follows:

Open water swimming

In the men's and women's 25 km race, both held on July 23, USA Swimming recommended its athletes not compete due to "extreme temperature conditions." USA swimming said the water temperature exceeded its recommended limit and as a result, Alex Meyer and Haley Anderson withdrew from the race.  However, Claire Thompson elected to stay in the race and was afforded the opportunity because of the Amateur Sports Act, which guarantees athletes the right to compete.  But USA Swimming said they would monitor her closely.  Thompson did not complete the race.

Mixed

Swimming

There will be 43 swimmers (21 men & 22 females) that will compete at the 2011 World Aquatics Championships.

Roster

Men

Nathan Adrian, Mihail Alexandrov, Ricky Berens, Tyler Clary, Conor Dwyer, Mark Gangloff, Charlie Houchin, Cullen Jones, Elliott Keefer, Chad LaTourette, Jason Lezak, Ryan Lochte, Tyler McGill, Michael Phelps, David Plummer, Scot Robison, Eric Shanteau, Nick Thoman, Peter Vanderkaay, David Walters, and Garrett Weber-Gale.

Women

Amanda Beard, Elizabeth Beisel, Natalie Coughlin, Teresa Crippen, Missy Franklin, Jessica Hardy, Kathleen Hersey, Katie Hoff, Kara Lynn Joyce, Dagny Knutson, Ariana Kukors, Caitlin Leverenz, Christine Magnuson, Elizabeth Pelton, Allison Schmitt, Morgan Scroggy, Rebecca Soni, Chloe Sutton, Jasmine Tosky, Dana Vollmer, Amanda Weir, and Kate Ziegler.

Results

Key: (WR) = World record, † = Americas record, ‡''' = National record

Synchronized swimming

United States has qualified 10 athletes in synchronised swimming.

Reserve
 Heidi Homma

Water polo

Men

Team Roster

 Merill Moses
 Peter Varellas
 Peter Hudnut
 Jeffery Powers
 Adam Wright
 Brain Alexander
 Ronald Beaubien
 Anthony Azevedo – Captain
 Timothy Hutten
 Jesse Smith
 Shea Buckner
 Andrew Stevens

Preliminary round

For the preliminary round, the United States has been grouped with Italy, Germany, and South Africa.

Group D

Results

Playoff round

Quarterfinals

Classification 5–8

Fifth place game

Women

Team Roster

 Elizabeth Anne Armstrong
 Heather Danielle Petri
 Melissa Jon Seidemann
 Brenda Villa
 Lauren Ashley Wenger
 Margaret Ann Steffens
 Courtney Mathewson
 Jessica Marie Steffens
 Elsie Ann Windes
 Kelly Kristen Rulon
 Annika Madsen Dries
 Kameryn Louise Craig
 Tumuaialii Anae

Preliminary round

For the preliminary round, the United States has been grouped with the Netherlands, Kazakhstan, and Hungary.

Group A

Results

Quarterfinals

Classification 5–8

Fifth place game

References

2011 in American sports
Nations at the 2011 World Aquatics Championships
United States at the World Aquatics Championships